Nababeep is a town in Namakwa District Municipality in the Northern Cape province of South Africa.

Nababeep is an old copper-mining town in Namaqualand, 19 km north-west of Springbok. Founded in 1860 by the Okiep Copper Company. The name is of Khoekhoen origin and means ‘rhinoceros place’.

References

Populated places in the Nama Khoi Local Municipality
Mining communities in South Africa
Populated places established in 1860